Events from the year 1790 in Denmark.

Incumbents
 Monarch – Christian VII
 Prime minister – Andreas Peter Bernstorff

Events

 
14 September –  Crown Prince Frederick and Crown Princess Marie Sophie arrives at Copenhagen.
 2324 September  The Danish Asiatic Company's Chinaman Juliane Maria wrecks in the Cinese Sea.

Births
 12 May – Carsten Hauch, poet (died 1872)

Deaths
 20 February – Erik Pauelsen, painter (born 1749)
 25 February – Daniel Ernst Bille, naval officer (born 1711)

References

 
1790s in Denmark
Denmark
Years of the 18th century in Denmark